The 1932 Walker Cup, the 7th Walker Cup Match, was played on September 1 and 2, 1932, at The Country Club, Brookline, Massachusetts. The United States won by 8 matches to 1 with 3 matches halved.

Because of the economic situation, there had been some doubt as to whether the match would take place. However, in January it was announced that the match would take place.

Format
Four 36-hole matches of foursomes were played on Thursday and eight singles matches on Friday. Each of the 12 matches was worth one point in the larger team competition. If a match was all square after the 36th hole extra holes were not played. The team with most points won the competition. If the two teams were tied, the previous winner would retain the trophy.

Teams
8 members of the 10-man Great Britain and Ireland team were announced in early April but no captain was mentioned at that time. The remaining two were announced in late May; John de Forest and Eric Fiddian, the two finalists in the Amateur Championship. Torrance was announced as the captain at the same time. 10 members of the 11-man United States team were selected at the end of May. Gus Moreland was added to the team in late August, as winner of the Western Amateur. Jimmy Johnston for the United States and Jack Bookless for Great Britain and Ireland were not selected for any matches. Johnston had been suffering from a twisted ankle and was not fully fit. Lister Hartley (1904–1969) and Rex Hartley (1905–1942) were brothers.

United States

Playing captain: Francis Ouimet
George Dunlap
Billy Howell
Jimmy Johnston
Maurice McCarthy
Don Moe
Gus Moreland
Charles Seaver
Jess Sweetser
George Voigt
Jack Westland

Great Britain & Ireland
 & 
Playing captain:  Tony Torrance
 Jack Bookless
 John Burke
 Leonard Crawley
 John de Forest
 Eric Fiddian
 Lister Hartley
 Rex Hartley
 Eric McRuvie
 Bill Stout

Thursday's foursomes

Friday's singles

References

Walker Cup
Walker Cup
Walker Cup
Sports in Brookline, Massachusetts
Golf in Massachusetts
Events in Norfolk County, Massachusetts
Walker Cup
Sports competitions in Massachusetts
Tourist attractions in Brookline, Massachusetts
Walker Cup